The 73rd season of the Campeonato Gaúcho kicked off on February 27, 1993 and ended on July 21, 1993. Twenty-four teams participated. Grêmio won their 29th title. Dínamo and Ta-Guá were relegated.

Participating teams

System 
The championship would have three stages:

 First phase: Grêmio and Internacional earned a bye directly to the Second phase. The remaining twenty-two teams played each other in a single round-robin system. The fourteen best teams qualified to the Second phase, while the bottom two teams would be relegated.
 Second phase: The sixteen remaining teams were divided into four groups of four, in which each team played the teams of its own group in a double round-robin system. The two best teams in each group qualified to the Final octogonal.
 Final octogonal: The remaining eight teams played each other in a double round-robin system, with the team with the most points winning the title.

Championship

First phase

Second phase

Group A

Group B

Group C

Group D

Final octogonal

References 

Campeonato Gaúcho seasons
Gaúcho